Dinosaur is the eighth studio album by Canadian rock band Theory of a Deadman which was released on March 17th 2023, through 604 Records in Canada and Atlantic and Roadrunner Records in the United States. The band continue their collaboration with Swedish music producer Martin Terefe who worked with them on their previous albums Wake Up Call and Say Nothing.

Track listing

Personnel
Theory of a Deadman
 Tyler Connolly – vocals, guitar, piano
 Dave Brenner – guitar, backing vocals
 Dean Back – bass, backing vocals
 Joey Dandeneau – drums, backing vocals
Production
 Neal Avron – mixing
 Tyler Connolly – engineering, producing, programming
 Clem Cherry – engineering, programming
 Dyre Gormsen – engineering
 Ted Jensen – mastering engineering
 Jorge Arango Kure – engineering
 Glen Scott – programming
 Scott Skrzynski – mixing
 Martin Terefe – producing
 Nikolaj Torp Larsen – engineering
 Oskar Winberg – engineering, programming

References

2023 albums
Atlantic Records albums
Theory of a Deadman albums
Albums produced by Martin Terefe
604 Records albums
Roadrunner Records albums